Qualitative Sociology is an academic journal dealing with sociology. It publishes research papers on the qualitative interpretation of social life.  This includes photographic studies, historical analysis, comparative analysis, and ethnography. The editors-in-chief are Claudio E. Benzecry (Northwestern University) and Andrew Deener (University of Connecticut).

Abstracting and indexing 
Qualitative Sociology is abstracted and indexed in the Social Sciences Citation Index. According to the Journal Citation Reports, the journal has a 2016 impact factor of 1.227.

References

External links
Publisher description

Qualitative research journals
Publications established in 1997
Springer Science+Business Media academic journals
English-language journals
Sociology journals